Fifth Third Center is a  skyscraper on Capitol Square in Downtown Columbus, Ohio. It was completed in 1998 and has 25 floors. Miller & Reeves designed the building, which is the 17th tallest in Columbus.  The skyscraper was designed in a post-modern style. The building was constructed as an addition to the Beggs Building, an Art Deco highrise built in 1928.

Wells Fargo Bank has filed to foreclose after owner TierREIT defaulted on a mortgage loan.

See also
List of tallest buildings in Columbus

References

External links

TierREIT

Skyscraper office buildings in Columbus, Ohio
Buildings in downtown Columbus, Ohio
Office buildings completed in 1998
Postmodern architecture in Ohio
Bank buildings in Columbus, Ohio
High Street (Columbus, Ohio)